Thessalonians may refer to:

 People of Thessaloniki, in Greece
 The two Pauline epistles to the people of Thessaloniki:
 First Epistle to the Thessalonians
 Second Epistle to the Thessalonians
 Thessalonians (band), a mid 1980s San Francisco experimental noise band founded by Larry Thrasher and Kim Cascone